The International Police Caps Collection  is a permanent exhibition of an international collection of police hats in the former railway station of the Slochteren Woldjerspoor in Slochteren. The collection is owned by the Department of the Groningen International Police Association.

Besides the nearly 1500 different police hats from over 220 countries, there are also including several police uniforms, handcuffs and police badges to admire.

The Dutch collection consists of old hats helmets from the 19th century to the current cap. The collection also includes police hats from other European countries and the rest of the world.

External links 
 Internationale Politiepetten Collectie

Law enforcement museums in Europe
Museums in Groningen (province)
Midden-Groningen